Budium  ( Boúdeion) or Budea  (Βούδεια Boúdeia) was a town of Magnesia in ancient Thessaly, mentioned by Homer in the Iliad. Apparently, there was a cult of Athena Boudeia at the town.

The site of Budium is unlocated.

References

Populated places in ancient Thessaly
Former populated places in Greece
Ancient Magnesia
Locations in the Iliad
Lost ancient cities and towns